Muhammad Zaidan (10 December 1948 – 8 March 2004), also known as Abu Abbas   ( Abū ʿAbbās ) or Muhammad Abbas, was (with Tal'at Ya'qoub) the founder and a leader  of the Palestine Liberation Front (PLF) Organization.

Political background
Zaidan was born in 1948 in Safed, Palestine, though other sources state that he was born in a Syrian refugee camp.

He studied at the Damascus University where he joined the radical, pro-Syrian Popular Front for the Liberation of Palestine – General Command (PFLP-GC) under Ahmed Jibril in 1968. In 1977, major disagreements arose between the PFLP-GC, the Palestine Liberation Organization (PLO), and other Palestinian factions based in Lebanon. Zaidan, who opposed Syrian involvement in the Lebanese war, left the PFLP-GC and created the PLF with Talaat Yaacoub, which eventually split into three separate factions (and then later re-merged). Zaydan's faction of the PLF, which was the largest of the three, moved its headquarters to Tunisia.

PLF leader
Since its inception in 1977, the Abbas-led PLF was a member of the Palestine Liberation Organization and received support from both the PLO and Yasser Arafat's Fatah movement. Unlike the PFLP-GC, the PLF has supported peace negotiations between Israel and the Palestinians. Zaidan was elected to the Executive Committee of the PLO in 1984 and represented the Palestinian National Council (PNC) in 1989 during peace negotiations with Israel. Although Zaidan was wanted by Israel for his involvement in guerrilla attacks against Israel (including attacks against civilians) throughout the 1970s, 1980s and 1990s, Israel allowed him to travel freely in the Gaza Strip throughout the 1990s because he supported the peace negotiations. One notable attack by the PLF under Zaidan's leadership resulted in the deaths of Danny Haran (age 28) and his two daughters, Einat (4) and Yael (2) in April 1979 in their Nahariya, Israel home by Samir Kuntar.

Achille Lauro hijacking
Throughout the 1980s, the PLF launched attacks on both civilian and military targets in the north of Israel, across the Lebanese border. In 1985 he masterminded the hijacking of the Italian cruise ship Achille Lauro. During the hijacking, 69-year-old American Jewish passenger Leon Klinghoffer, who used a wheelchair, was shot dead and thrown overboard. The four hijackers, fearful of United States military intervention, surrendered to Egypt in return for safe passage out of Egypt, based on the pretext that they had done no harm to any of the passengers. Four F-14 aircraft from the U.S. 6th Fleet intercepted the plane carrying the hijackers to Tunisia and escorted it to Sigonella, a NATO base in Italy. There they discovered that Zaidan and PLO political officer Hassan were also on the plane. Insider deals within the Italian government made them both flown from Sigonella to Rome. From there, Zaidan and Hassan boarded a Yugoslav civilian airliner bound for Belgrade, Yugoslavia. Despite American requests for the extradition of Zaidan from Yugoslavia, he was not extradited because of Yugoslav relations with the PLO. He then flew to Aden, South Yemen and from there to Baghdad, where Saddam Hussein sheltered him from extradition to Italy. He remained in Iraq and commanded the PLF (reunited in 1989) until the American invasion of Iraq in 2003.

Italy sentenced Zaidan in absentia to five terms of life imprisonment for his role in the Achille Lauro hijacking. He was also wanted in the US for crimes including terrorism, piracy and murder. In 1996, he apologized for the Achille Lauro hijacking and the murder of Leon Klinghoffer and advocated peace talks between Palestinians and Israel; the apology was rejected by the US government and Klinghoffer's family.

Death in custody
On 14 April 2003, Zaidan was captured by American forces in Iraq while attempting to flee from Baghdad to Syria. Italy subsequently requested his extradition. The Pentagon reported on 9 March 2004 that Zaidan had died the previous day, of natural causes, while in U.S. custody. The PLF accused the Americans of assassinating their leader. The U.S. authorities agreed to give Abbas' body to the Palestine Red Crescent Society for burial in Ramallah on the West Bank. However, his burial there was blocked by the Israeli authorities, and he was buried in the Martyrs' Cemetery in Damascus instead.

References

External links
 
 Achille Lauro hijacking, BBC H2G2
 U.S. captures mastermind of Achille Lauro hijacking, David Ensor, CNN, 16 April 2003
 The World Should Know What He Did to My Family, Smadar Haran Kaiser, Washington Post (mirror), 18 May 2003

1948 births
2004 deaths
Fugitives
Fugitives wanted by Iraq
Hijackers
MS Achille Lauro
Palestinian Liberation Front members
Palestine Liberation Organization members
Palestinian Arab nationalists
Palestinian nationalists
Palestinian people who died in prison custody
Palestinian terrorism
People imprisoned on charges of terrorism
Prisoners who died in United States military detention